Atlantis: The Lost Empire – Search for the Journal is a 2001 first-person shooter game developed by Zombie Studios and published by Disney Interactive. It was released on May 1, 2001, for Microsoft Windows. The game serves as a prequel to the film Atlantis: The Lost Empire. It covers the search Milo Thatch's grandfather, Thaddeus Thatch, took to Iceland to find the sacred book given to Milo. It was released for free in children's magazines, DVDs, Kellogg's cereal boxes, and in pharmacies. The game was also offered as a free download through Disney Interactive's website in June 2001.

The game served as a demo to Atlantis: The Lost Empire – Trial by Fire, with Search for the Journal comprising the first levels of Trial by Fire.

Gameplay
The game begins with a clip that was originally set to begin the movie. It shows a Viking war party trying to use The Shepherd's Journal to find Atlantis. They are swiftly dispatched by the Leviathan. The game then shifts to Iceland in 1901. The player is a trooper assigned to finding The Shepherd's Journal. Trying to stop the player are the 'Keepers', a group of Iceland natives with mystical powers.

Levels
The first sequence has the main character floating down a river. There are some sprites in the distance and the player can hear dialogue from Thaddeus Thatch.
After departing from the boat, the player travels along an icy path dodging snowballs and battling a few keepers. It is recommended to walk quickly over bridges to avoid long alternate paths.
After boarding a plane, player goes through a canyon. There are a few narrow stretches and ice particles that are shooting at player.
The player makes it to the Keeper's Keep and go inside. After hearing dialogue from Commander Rourke & Thaddeus Thatch, the player battles several keepers as the player makes way down into the labyrinth.
The player enters the Journal Room and must pass four trials (Water, Fire, Wind, & Earth) to obtain four talismans while battling numerous keepers. After placing all four talismans on a pedestal, the pedestal lowers and the player obtains the Journal. 
The game then shows several scenes from the movie as a teaser.

References

External links

2001 video games
Atlantis: The Lost Empire
Disney video games
Disney Interactive
First-person shooters
Multiplayer and single-player video games
Video games based on animated films
Video games based on films
Video games developed in the United States
Video games set in the 1900s
Video games set in Iceland
Windows-only games
Windows games
Zombie Studios games